Cherokee Outlet often referred to as the Cherokee Strip, is in what is now the state of Oklahoma.

Cherokee Strip may also refer to:
Cherokee Strip (Kansas), a disputed strip of land on the southern border of Kansas
Cherokee Strip, California, a census-designated place in Kern County, California
 The Cherokee Strip, a 1937 American western film
 Cherokee Strip (film), a 1940 American Western